is a fictional character from Hajime Isayama's manga series Attack on Titan. Mikasa is introduced as a young villager living with the protagonist, the young Eren Yeager, and his family which took her following the deaths of her parents. When giant creatures known as Titans invade the area and eat Eren's mother, Mikasa and Eren become members of the Military and joins the Survey Corps—an elite group of soldiers who fight Titans outside the walls and also study the physiology of Titans in order to know what they are fighting. Nevertheless, Mikasa's main reason for fighting is due to her love towards Eren. She has also appeared in video games and the anime adaptation.

Isayama based Mikasa on a real person he met before he became a manga artist keeping the original idea of her being Asian in order to stand out within the Western look a like cast. Her relationship with Eren was one originally conceived to also stand out across other love relationships due to Mikasa was not written to side with Eren as it would weaken her character while Eren instead does not find her as a love interest. Mikasa is voiced by Yui Ishikawa in Japanese and Trina Nishimura in English with the two voice actress being surprised by the popularity of their works and charming sides of Mikasa despite being often stoic.

Critical response to Mikasa's characterization was positive for standing out as a skilled female warrior in a male-oriented series and has won several awards as the manga and anime were released. Though she was praised for her calm personality which contrasts Eren's active talks, critics were also surprised by the charming side she shows towards Eren in the narrative. Both voice actress were also praised by the media.

Creation and design

After he first moved to Tokyo, Hajime Isayama was working partimte and one of his clients became the model of Mikasa. She covered her face with a muffler late at night, and the near mangaka thought this look of hers was endearing. When she came to the store, Isayama came up with the first sketch of the heroine. He was sure that the customer who became Mikasa's model was Asian, contrasting the Western-like characters often seen in the manga, most notably Eren. Only Mikasa's race as someone of Asian descent has been noted. He intended to show the Mikasa's lineage as an important plot point. Isayama stated that Mikasa, Levi, and Kenny are all part of the same Ackerman bloodline. However, their reasons for protecting their respective counterparts do not have anything to do with the bloodline itself—"it is just their nature." 

There are some parts of Mikasa that are "unrefined", yet on the other hand, she has a brave personality. Isayama believes he was influenced by Casca from Berserk when writing Mikasa. Isayama noted it is generic that a heroine is usually a woman who motivates a man. However, he does not really like that way of thinking as it would poorly affect Mikasa's and the reason due to how she becomes a strong woman in the story. In reality, there are differences between the skeletal structure and muscle count of men and women which cause the difference in their potential strengths. However, if that fact is just reflected in the manga normally, it wouldn no be interesting anymore for Isayama. For the protagonist Eren Yeager, rather than a lover, Mikasa's presence is more like a mother to him and rather than form a relationship with her, Isayama claims that he instead searches for a way to become independent. 

Isayama further compared the trio of Eren, Mikasa and Armin to high school students who grow across childhood until graduating. He viewed the scene of the trio seeing the sea as an alternate ending to the manga.  By the manga's 22nd volume, Isayama drew an image of Eren looking at the sea, something that motivated him during his childhood. Isayama said Mikasa and Armin had developed a habitual mindset of revolving around him and wishing to help Eren. According to the author, at first their mindset was favoritism, comparing Eren's relationships with Mikasa and Armin to that of helping one's relatives or siblings who are encountering hardship, even if onlookers question it. Her name is noted to come from the Mikasa, a famous pre-dreadnought battleship of the Imperial Japanese Navy. Mikasa's surname is derived from the Yiddish cognate of German name "Ackermann" ("Ackerman" in Yiddish) meaning "one who works the fields."

Casting

Mikasa is voiced by Yui Ishikawa in Japanese, and by Trina Nishimura in the English dub. Ishikawa said that Mikasa cares mainly about Eren, and keeps a distance from the rest of the world. She says that "While she might seem like a character with so few emotional levels, there are actually many feelings that swirl around her heart." She did not read the original work of until being told about the audition for the anime. Upon reading the Attack on Titan manga, Ishikawa was attracted by the mystery and development of the character. Ishikawa wanted the role for the series and was surprised by the popularity she obtained across the years. When Mikasa confesses her feelings to Eren in the anime's second season, the actress noted that Eren did not share such response to her, the two still had the chance to become a couple in the future.

Trina Nishimura learned of the series thanks to her brother who showed her the first episode of the anime and she became charmed by it. Nishimura expressed pressure when auditioning for the role and was surprised by the large popularity it had. She often listened to recordings of Ishikawa's work to get experience about the portrayal of Mikasa. While recording the series, she avoided reading the manga because it could ruin her work. Like Ishikawa, Nishimura enjoyed Mikasa's love confession for being able to provide comfort to Eren in the middle of a dark scene. Meanwhile, Nishimura often talked with voice actor director Mike McFarland in regards to her work as she had poor views on her own work. 

With the coming of the final story arc in the anime adaptation, Nishimura was committed to the new developments of her character especially in her reintroduction. She befriended Eren's English actor Bryce Papenbrook. During recordings of the final season, Nishimura commented that while Mikasa is not known properly for emoting, she noted that she became sad more often which she saw as a major improvement over hear early characterization. She commented Mikasa to be put on a dilemma in regards to her devotion to the Military or Eren as a result of major developments in the story but did not want to expand on that. The amount of violence coming from the series led to Nishimura's fear of Mikasa being killed every time she had to do recording of the series.

In the live-action film, she is portrayed by Kiko Mizuhara. Mizuhara referred to Mikasa as an inspiring character due to her strengh as well as caring due to the love she shows towards Eren.

Appearances
Mikasa is Eren's childhood friend who was taken in by his family after seeing her parents brutally murdered by human traffickers. Though not explicitly stated to be adopted by the Jaegers within the series, it is shown that she at least felt a strong sense of gratitude toward them as caretakers, as well as Eren, who had saved her life and given her an iconic scarf. Her parents' tragic deaths had an overwhelming influence on her, causing her to lose her innocence and realize the world's cruelty. This caused her personality to become more quiet and withdrawn, maintaining a stoic expression except when it comes to Eren and her friends. As Eren's committed caretaker, she feels compelled to follow and protect him at all costs, even joining him in the Survey Corps. Graduating from the Training Corps at the top of her class, she is regarded by officers as an unprecedented genius and prodigy, easily worth a hundred soldiers in battle. 

As later revealed, this is due to Mikasa's father being a descendant of the Ackerman clan, an Eldian bloodline that was genetically modified to create super soldiers equal to a Titan in strength, originally designed to protect Eldia's king. When under duress, these genetically inherited abilities may allow a descendant access to their ancestors' battle experience. Mikasa's Ackerman instincts were first awakened in the aftermath of her parents' deaths when Eren urged her to 'fight' back against her kidnappers. Though technically half-blooded, she is also the last known person of Asian descent residing in the Walls. While investigating the Marleyan Volunteers alongside the Survey Corps, Eren reveals to Mikasa that he has always hated her for being enslaved to her Ackerman blood that "forces" her to protect him. In turn, she becomes despondent and removes her scarf from her neck. While still caring for Eren, Mikasa decides to join the alliance to stop Eren's planned genocide on the world. In the climax against Eren's forces, Mikasa loses consciousness and has a dream of an alternate scenario where she and Eren escaped from the military and are living together. Mikasa recovers to kill the real Eren and kisses him in their last time. In the aftermath, Eren confesses to Armin that he actually loves Mikasa and cared for his allies but did not want to drag them into his massacre. Mikasa buries Eren underneath a tree on a hill near Shiganshina District. The tree grows over time to resemble the one where the organism that granted Ymir her Titan power lived. An unspecified amount of time after Mikasa's death from old age, a modernized Shiganshina is reduced to rubble in a war.

Reception

Popularity
Mikasa was also a popular character. She was awarded "Female Character" in the Newtype 2013 awards.  In the Newtype Anime Awards 2016-2017, Mikasa took fourth in the favorite female character category. In the Anime Awards Selecta Visión, she took the award of "Best Female Lead Character". Yui Ishikawa won the "Best Supporting Actress" for her work as Mikasa Ackerman in the 8th Seiyu Awards. In the 36th Anime Grand Prix she was second in "Best Female Character". In the 3rd BTVA Anime Dub Awards, Mikasa's actress Trina Nishimura also won for her English dub.

Critical response
The characterization of Mikasa was praised by Anime News Network for standing out as skilled heroine and mentioned that her emotional moments involve her devotion towards Eren. Furthermore, the writer believes the spin-offs show how different Mikasa's personality would had she met Eren on different situations which makes her original persona more appealing. Blu-ray.com saw that the origins of Mikasa and Eren is especially violent, most notably when the protagonists become soldiers. Her characterization in the episode "Warrior" was acclaimed by Manga.Tokyo for how violent against the traitors from the groups.

THEM Anime Reviews found Mikasa more appealing than Eren due to her calmer personality and notable skills which stand out so much in the story that she finds the series to be feminist and laments how little screentime Mikasa has in favor of the protagonist. Elliot Gray of Japanator found Mikasa and Armin more appealing than Eren. Similarly, Anna Neatrour from Manga Bookshelf found her as a nice contrast to Eren's rude persona. Mikasa's love confession towards Eren was acclaimed by both IGN and Anime News Network due to the portrayal of both actors and how the directing turns a tragic scene into a comforting one.

For the final arc,  Den of Geek and IGN enjoyed the confrontation Eren has with Mikasa and Armin for the first time much to their surprise as they have always been kind with each other. IGN viewed his role as more ambiguous when he talks to Mikasa in a flashback about their bonds. The Fandom Post commented despite his aggressive comments, Eren's new characterization might include lies as some generate a major impact on Mikasa's feelings for her. In universe, the song "Under the Tree" is also themed to be "Mikasa's song, in contrast to SiM's previous single "The Rumbling", which focused primarily on Eren. The song's cover art also depicts Mikasa who has taken off a red scarf that Eren gave her when they were children, symbolizing a rift taking place between the two characters in the show. Mikasa's killing and last kiss towards Eren in the finale was praised for how the character for its tragic appeal though the relationship they shared seemed to have a different point of view considering Isayama's original comments about the idea of Mikasa and Eren being a couple as the author claimed that the latter did not see former as such love interest.

References

Primary sources
Attack on Titan manga volumes by Hajime Isayama. Original Japanese version published by Kodansha. English version by Kodansha USA.

Specific

External links
  

Attack on Titan
Comics characters introduced in 2009
Female characters in anime and manga
Female soldier and warrior characters in anime and manga
Fictional acrobats
Fictional characters based on real people
Fictional child soldiers
Fictional monster hunters
Fictional swordfighters in anime and manga